Ditrigona quinquelineata is a moth in the family Drepanidae. It was described by John Henry Leech in 1898. It is found in Japan.

References

Moths described in 1898
Drepaninae
Moths of Japan